Paul Cornu (June 15, 1881 – 6 June 1944) was a French engineer.

Life
Paul Cornu, of Romanian origins, was born in Glos la Ferrière, France and was one of thirteen children. At a young age, he helped his father in his transports company. He made history by designing the world's first successful manned rotary wing aircraft.

Cornu first built an unmanned experimental design powered by a 2 hp Buchet engine.

His manned helicopter was powered by a  Antoinette engine. He piloted this construction himself at Normandy,  France on November 13, 1907. Previously, a French helicopter, the Breguet-Richet Gyroplane I, had managed to lift off under its own power, but it had been held in position by men standing on the ground. Cornu's performance was a considerable progress because his aircraft flew without additional support and lifted Cornu about 30 cm (1 ft) for 20 seconds.  Unfortunately this early helicopter was scarcely maneuverable and had only a few additional flights. The construction was not much further developed by this technical pioneer, who had to keep on making a living by manufacturing bicycles.

Death 
Paul Cornu died aged 62 in 1944 in Lisieux, France, when his home was destroyed during the bombardment by the Allies that accompanied the Normandy landings of World War II.

References

External links 
 U.S. Centennial of Flight Commission - about Paul Cornu
 Detailed life and achievements of Paul Cornu with photos

1881 births
1944 deaths
20th-century French engineers
20th-century French inventors
Aircraft designers
Aviation inventors
Aviation pioneers
French people of Romanian descent
French aerospace engineers
French aviators
French civilians killed in World War II
Members of the Early Birds of Aviation